Night Rider, Nightrider, or variants thereof may refer to:

Literature
 Night Rider (novel), a 1939 novel by Robert Penn Warren
 Night Rider, a 2001 novel by W. A. Harbinson written under the Shaun Clarke pseudonym
 Nightrider (DC Comics), a comic book character
 Night Rider, a previous name of Marvel Comics character Phantom Rider

Film
 Night Rider (2022 film), a Sri Lankan film
 The Night Rider (film), a 1932 Western starring Harry Carey
 The Night Riders (1916 film), a film starring Harry Carey
 The Night Riders (1920 film), a British film directed by Alexander Butler
 The Night Riders (1939 film), a film starring John Wayne
 Night Riders (1981 film), a Czechoslovak film
 Nightrider, nickname of character Crawford Montazano in the film Mad Max

Militant organizations
 The Night Riders, participants in the Black Patch Tobacco Wars in Kentucky and Tennessee, circa 1904–1909
 Night rider, a member of the Ku Klux Klan

Music
 Jon and the Nightriders, an American surf music band
 Night Rider (album), 1978 album by Count Basie and Oscar Peterson
 Nightrider (album), 1975 album by The Charlie Daniels Band

Songs
 "Nightrider", by Electric Light Orchestra from the 1975 album, Face The Music
 "Night Rider", a song by Elvis Presley from his 1962 album Pot Luck
 "Night Rider", a song by The Hondells from their self-titled 1964 album
 "Nightrider", a song by Dokken from their 1981 album Breaking the Chains
 "Nightrider", a song by Queensrÿche from their 1983 debut self-titled EP Queensrÿche
 "Night Rider", a song by George Thorogood from his 1997 album Rockin' My Life Away
 "Night Riders", a song by Lee Aaron from her 1982 album The Lee Aaron Project

Other
 NightRider (bus service), in Melbourne, Australia
 Nightrider (chess), a fairy chess piece
 NightRiders, Incorporated, an American designated-driver-for-hire service
 Harley the Nightrider, a professional wrestler from All-Star Wrestling

See also
 
 
 Night Ride (disambiguation)
 Knight Rider (disambiguation)